Bulgarian–Turkish relations are foreign relations between Bulgaria and Turkey.  Bulgaria has an embassy in Ankara, two general consulates in Istanbul and Edirne and a chancellery in Bursa. Turkey has an embassy in Sofia and two general consulates in Plovdiv and Burgas.

History 
Bulgaria hosted the European Union-Turkey summit on 26 March 2018.

Diplomacy

Republic of Bulgaria
Ankara (Embassy)
Istanbul (Consulate-General)
Edirne (Consulate-General)

Republic of Turkey
Sofia (Embassy)
Plovdiv (Consulate-General)
Burgas (Consulate-General)

See also 
 Foreign relations of Bulgaria
 Foreign relations of Turkey
 Turks in Bulgaria
 Bulgarian Turks in Turkey
 European Union–Turkey relations
 Bulgaria–Turkey border
 Turks in Europe

References

External links 

 Turkish embassy in Sofia
 Bulgarian embassies in Turkey
 Turkish Ministry of Foreign Affairs about relations with Bulgaria

 
Turkey
Bilateral relations of Turkey
Relations of colonizer and former colony